Jalan Parit Raja Darat (Johor state route J121) is a major road in Johor, Malaysia

List of junctions

Roads in Johor